The 1470s decade ran from January 1, 1470, to December 31, 1479.

Significant people

References